André-Eugène Blondel (28 August 1863 – 15 November 1938) was a French engineer and physicist. He is the inventor of the electromechanical oscillograph and a system of photometric units of measurement.

Life
Blondel was born in Chaumont, Haute-Marne, France. His father was a magistrate from an old family in the town of Dijon. He was the best student from the town in his year. He went on to attend the École nationale des ponts et chaussées (School of Bridges and Roadways) and graduated first in his class in 1888. He was employed as an engineer by the Lighthouses and Beacons Service until he retired in 1927 as its general first class inspector. He became a professor of electrotechnology at the School of Bridges and Highways and the School of Mines in Paris.

Very early  in his career he suffered immobility due to a paralysis of his legs, which confined him to his room for 27 years, but he never stopped working.

In 1893 André Blondel sought to solve the problem of integral synchronization, using the theory proposed by Cornu. He determined the conditions under which the curve traced by a high-speed recording instrument would follow as closely as possible the actual variations of the physical phenomenon being studied.

This led him to invent the bifilar and soft iron oscillographs. These instruments won the grand prize at the St. Louis Exposition in 1904. They were more powerful than the classical stroboscope, invented in 1891 then in use. They  remained the best way to record high-speed electrical phenomena for more than 40 years when they were replaced by the cathode ray oscilloscope. They paved the way for a greater understanding of the behavior of alternating current.

Blondel built a theory of rectification with asymmetrical electrodes. He demonstrated that there were three kinds of electric arc: the primitive arc of William Duddell, the secondary arc of Valdemar Poulsen, and a succession of oscillatory discharges.

In 1892, he published a study on the coupling of synchronous generators on a large AC electric grid. This analysis had also been done a little earlier by another electrical engineer, Paul Boucherot, using a different approach, and the two authors arrived at similar conclusions.

In 1894 he proposed the lumen and other new measurement units for use in photometry, based on the metre and the Violle candle. He coined the names of the phot and the stilb around 1920.

In 1899, he published Empirical Theory of Synchronous Generators which contained the basic theory of
the two armature reactions (direct and transverse). It was used extensively to explain the properties of salient-pole AC machines.

In 1909, assisted by M. Mähl, he worked on one of the first long distance schemes for the transmission of AC power. The project created a (then) large 300,000 hp hydroelectric power plant at Genissiat on the Rhône, and transmitted electrical power to Paris more than 350 km away using polyphase AC current at 120 kV.

In 1914 he performed a series of experiments in order to determine what was the most general law of electromagnetic induction.

He died in Paris on 15 November 1938.

Honours and awards
Blondel was made a member of the French Academy of Sciences in 1913. He was appointed commander of the Légion d'honneur in 1927, and was awarded the Faraday Medal in 1937. He also received the medal of the Franklin Institute, the Montefiore award and Lord Kelvin award.

In 1942 Parry Moon proposed to rename the unit of luminance apostilb the blondel.

See also
Blondel's theorem

Notes

References
 André Blondel - French Scientist and Engineer by Gerard-Andre Capolino in IEEE Industry Applications Magazine, May/June 2004. Accessed June 2008
 André-Eugène Blondel  Institute of Chemistry at The Hebrew University of Jerusalem. Published on April 17, 2003. Accessed June 2008
 Some portraits - Andre Blondel Academie de Poitiers, France. Accessed June 2008 (French)

French civil engineers
École Polytechnique alumni
École des Ponts ParisTech alumni
Corps des ponts
1863 births
1938 deaths
Commandeurs of the Légion d'honneur
French physicists
Members of the French Academy of Sciences
Honorary Members of the USSR Academy of Sciences
19th-century French inventors